Ceriodaphnia dubia is a species of water flea in the class Branchiopoda, living in freshwater lakes, ponds, and marshes in most of the world. Males are smaller than females. C. dubia moves using a powerful set of second antennae, and is used in toxicity testing of wastewater treatment plant effluent water in the United States. Climate change and particularly ultraviolet radiation B may seriously damage C. dubia populations, as they seems to be more sensitive than other cladocerans such as Daphnia pulex or D. pulicaria.

References

Cladocera
Crustaceans described in 1894